M. Nazim Uddin Al Azad Bangladeshi Politician, journalist and former minister who was the Member of Parliament for the then Jessore-10 and Jessore-4 constituencies.

Career
Azad was elected to parliament from Jessore-10 as an Bangladesh Nationalist Party candidate in 1979. He was elected to parliament from Jessore-4 as an Independent candidate in 1988. He was a former minister of religion and former minister of water resources.

References

Bikalpa Dhara Bangladesh politicians
Living people
4th Jatiya Sangsad members
Year of birth missing (living people)
2nd Jatiya Sangsad members